Mường Thanh is a ward (phường) of Điện Biên Phủ in Điện Biên Province in northwestern Vietnam. It was a township of Điện Biên District before it was incorporated into Điện Biên Phủ city.

Mường Thanh is named after Muang Theng or Müang Thaeng, which was, according to the Khun Borom creation myth, the original home of the Tai peoples (Lao, Thai, Shan, upland Tai peoples). 

Until the 1950s, Mường Thanh was the centre of an autonomous chiefdom of the Tai Dam ("Black Tai"), one of the 12 cantons of the confederation Sip Song Chau Tai.

References 

Communes of Điện Biên province
Populated places in Điện Biên province
Dien Bien Phu